(born September 6, 1962) is a Japanese historical sociologist, a professor at Keio University, a documentary filmmaker, and a guitarist.

Born in Akishima in Tokyo Metropolis in 1962, Oguma received his PhD from Tokyo University in 1998. Since 1997, he has been on the faculty at Keio University, where he was named a full professor in 2007. Oguma has written extensively on postwar social and political history, and issues of Japanese nationalism. Recently, he has turned to documentary filmmaking, directing a documentary on Japanese protests against nuclear power in the aftermath of the 2011 Tōhoku earthquake and tsunami, entitled "Tell the Prime Minister" (2015).

Selected publications
In a statistical overview derived from writings by and about Oguma Eiji, OCLC/WorldCat encompasses roughly 53 works in 150+ publications in 4 languages and 1,500+ library holdings library holdings.

A Genealogy of "Japanese" Self-Images. (2002)
1968. (2009)
 
The Boundaries of "the Japanese". (2014)

References

External links
"Tell the Prime Minister" English Web Site

1962 births
Living people
Historians of Japan
University of Tokyo alumni
Academic staff of Keio University
People from Akishima, Tokyo